The 1975 Philta International Championships was a men's tennis tournament played an outdoor hard courts in Manila, Philippines. It was the third edition of the tournament and was held from 27 October through 2 November 1975. The tournament was part of the Grand Prix tennis circuit and categorized in Group A. Ross Case won the singles title and the $12,000 first prize money.

Finals

Singles
 Ross Case defeated  Corrado Barazzutti 6–3, 6–1
 It was Case's 1st singles title of the year and the 4th of his career.

Doubles
 Ross Case /  Geoff Masters defeated  Syd Ball /  Kim Warwick 6–1, 6–2

References

External links
 ITF tournament edition details

Philippine International Tennis Tournament
 International Tennis Tournament
Philippine International Tennis Tournament
Philippine International Tennis Tournament
Tennis in the Philippines